The Hannah Bridge is a covered bridge in Linn County in the U.S. state of Oregon.  It was added to the National Register of Historic Places as Hannah Bridge in 1979.

It is one of three remaining covered bridges along Thomas Creek; the others are the Shimanek Bridge and the Gilkey Bridge.

He built one of the first sawmills in the area.

See also
 List of bridges on the National Register of Historic Places in Oregon
 List of Oregon covered bridges

References

External links

Bridges completed in 1936
Covered bridges on the National Register of Historic Places in Oregon
Bridges in Linn County, Oregon
Wooden bridges in Oregon
Tourist attractions in Linn County, Oregon
National Register of Historic Places in Linn County, Oregon
Road bridges on the National Register of Historic Places in Oregon
Howe truss bridges in the United States